Kruthik Hanagavadi (born 16 January 1996) is an Indian cricketer. He made his Twenty20 debut on 8 November 2019, for Mumbai in the 2019–20 Syed Mushtaq Ali Trophy.

Before his debut for Mumbai, he played in the T20 Mumbai League, where he was named the Best Emerging Player of the tournament.

References

External links
 

1996 births
Living people
Indian cricketers
Mumbai cricketers
Place of birth missing (living people)